This is a comprehensive list of songs recorded by Japanese rock band Buck-Tick. Since the band formed in 1983, it has released nineteen studio albums.

Table

References

Buck-Tick